Boseulachi, occasionally spelled boslachi, was a South Korean insult formed from the words boji ((보지) "vagina") and byoseulachi (벼슬아치 "bureaucrat").

History
Some say the word originated during the 90s in the early days of Korean internet communities in PC Tongshin. But the word boseulachi is said to be emerged in 2006 on South Korean internet forums as a term South Korean men use to describe vain and egotistical women.  It was ordinarily directed towards a girl or woman with an aggressive personality. The usage of the word waned after 2014.

Related expressions
A related expression was Doenjang Girl. A Doenjang Girl seeks luxury and is vain and proud.

See also 
 Female chauvinism
 Feminazi
 Misandry

References

External links 
 boslachi.com: South Korean Anti-Boseulachi site
 Anti-Boseulachi cafe
 <나꼼수> '실패한 농담'이 남긴 뒷맛 프레시안 
 '압구정 가슴녀'와 '분당선 대변녀', 공통점은… 프레시안 
 新결혼관에 남성들 쓴웃음 짓는 이유  Ilyosisanews 2010-06-22 
  적령기女 미혼율 60% mediapen
 ‘보트릭스’ 속 ‘보슬아치’ 잡는 ‘초식남’을 아시나요? 新결혼관에 남성들 쓴웃음 짓는 이유 디시뉴스 2010-06-25 

Society of South Korea
Slang terms for women
Pejorative terms for women
Korean words and phrases